The Quintin and Alice Hogg Memorial is a memorial for English philanthropist Quintin Hogg and his wife Alice stands on Portland Place in central London, opposite BBC Broadcasting House. The bronze memorial depicts Quintin Hogg with two boys, and stands on a plinth of Portland stone. It was designed by George Frampton and erected in 1906. The memorial also honours Hogg's wife, Alice, and those members of the Regent Street Polytechnic (now the University of Westminster) killed in World War I and World War II.

The memorial has been Grade II listed since February 1970.

Inscriptions
There are three inscriptions on the memorial, to honour the Hoggs, and those members of the polytechnic killed in the World Wars.

On the front face of the plinth:

On the left face of the plinth:

On the right face of the plinth:

Sports ground
The University's Quintin Hogg Memorial Sports Ground is also in London, on Hartington Road, Chiswick.

References

External links
 

1906 establishments in England
London
Bronze sculptures in the United Kingdom
Grade II listed buildings in the City of Westminster
Granite sculptures in the United Kingdom
Monuments and memorials in London
Outdoor sculptures in London
Sculptures by George Frampton
University of Westminster
World War I memorials in England
World War II memorials in England
Monuments and memorials to women